Pterolophia dohrni is a species of beetle in the family Cerambycidae. It was described by Francis Polkinghorne Pascoe in 1875.

References

dohrni
Beetles described in 1875